SS Alacrity was a tug built in Graville, France in 1893 as Jean Bart and was operated by the Dunkirk Chamber of Commerce. She was sold in 1902 to Howard Smith and renamed Alacrity for tug service in Port Phillip, Australia. During the First World War, she was purchased by the Royal Australian Navy in 1917 for use as a patrol vessel, inspection vessel, and minesweeper based at Fremantle. She was never commissioned. After being sold in 1925, she was slated for breaking up and was moored in Jervoise Bay, Western Australia, until a fierce gale in Cockburn Sound wrecked her in 1931.

Notes

References
Wilson, Michael; Royal Australian Navy 21st Century Warships, Naval auxiliaries 1911 to 1999 including Defence Maritime Services, Profile No. 4 – Revised Edition, Topmill Pty Ltd, Marrickville.

External links
Photo of Navy tug Alacrity
Photos of Alacrity wreck c.1945.

1893 ships
Ships built in France
Auxiliary ships of the Royal Australian Navy
Tugboats of Australia
Shipwrecks of Western Australia
Maritime incidents in 1931
1931 in Australia
1930s in Western Australia